Acanthophlebia is a genus of pronggill mayflies in the family Leptophlebiidae. There is one described species in Acanthophlebia, '''Acanthophlebia cruentata.

Taxonomy
George Hudson first described Acanthophlebia cruentata under the name Atalophlebia cruentata in his book New Zealand Neuroptera in 1904.

Distribution 
This species is endemic to New Zealand and found only in the North Island.

References

Further reading

 
 

Mayflies
Mayfly genera
Monotypic insect genera
Articles created by Qbugbot
Endemic fauna of New Zealand
Endemic insects of New Zealand